The 2022 FIBA U16 Women's European Championship is the 32nd edition of the Women's European basketball championship for national under-16 teams. It is being played from 19 to 27 August 2022 in Matosinhos, Portugal.

Participating teams
After the 2022 Russian invasion of Ukraine, Russia were expelled from the competition. They were replaced by Poland, 14th in the 2019 Division A edition.

  (Third place, 2019 FIBA U16 Women's European Championship Division B)

  (Runners-up, 2019 FIBA U16 Women's European Championship Division B)

  (Winners, 2019 FIBA U16 Women's European Championship Division B)

First round
The draw of the first round was held on 15 February 2022 in Freising, Germany.

In the first round, the teams were drawn into four groups of four. All teams advance to the playoffs.

Group A

Group B

Group C

Group D

Playoffs

Main bracket

5th place bracket

9th place bracket

13th place bracket

Final standings

Awards

All-Tournament Team

  Iyana Martin Carrion
  Awa Fam Thiam
  Petra Bozan
  Lena Bilic
  Tea Cleante
Source

References

2022
2022–23 in European women's basketball
International youth basketball competitions hosted by Portugal
FIBA U16
August 2022 sports events in Portugal
Sport in Matosinhos